Perini may refer to

People
 Fabio Perini (born 1940), Italian entrepreneur and inventor
 Flora Perini (1887–1975), Italian operatic mezzo-soprano
 Lorenzo Perini (1994-), Italian hurdler
 Pete Perini (1928–2008), American football player

Other
 Perini (dance), an Indian classical dance form
 Tutor Perini Corporation
 Perini Building Company
 Perini Journal, a trade publication for the tissue paper industry
 Perini Navi, shipbuilder

See also
 Pierini (disambiguation)